UnitedHealthcare Pro Cycling or simply UnitedHealthcare may refer to either of two defunct cycling teams sponsored by UnitedHealth Group:

UnitedHealthcare Pro Cycling (men's team), which competed on the UCI World Tour from 2003 to 2018 (taking on the UnitedHealthcare name in 2009)
UnitedHealthcare Pro Cycling (women's team), which competed on the UCI Women's World Tour from 2004 to 2018